Spirometry (meaning the measuring of breath) is the most common of the pulmonary function tests (PFTs). It measures lung function, specifically the amount (volume) and/or speed (flow) of air that can be inhaled and exhaled. Spirometry is helpful in assessing breathing patterns that identify conditions such as asthma, pulmonary fibrosis, cystic fibrosis, and COPD. It is also helpful as part of a system of health surveillance, in which breathing patterns are measured over time.

Spirometry generates pneumotachographs, which are charts that plot the volume and flow of air coming in and out of the lungs from one inhalation and one exhalation.

Indications
Spirometry is indicated for the following reasons:
 to diagnose or manage asthma
 to detect respiratory disease in patients presenting with symptoms of breathlessness, and to distinguish respiratory from cardiac disease as the cause
 to measure bronchial responsiveness in patients suspected of having asthma
 to diagnose and differentiate between obstructive lung disease and restrictive lung disease
 to follow the natural history of disease in respiratory conditions
 to assess of impairment from occupational asthma
 to identify those at risk from pulmonary barotrauma while scuba diving
 to conduct pre-operative risk assessment before anaesthesia or cardiothoracic surgery
 to measure response to treatment of conditions which spirometry detects
 to diagnose the vocal cord dysfunction.

Contraindications
Forced expiratory maneuvers may aggravate some medical conditions. Spirometry should not be performed when the individual presents with:
 Hemoptysis of unknown origin
 Pneumothorax
 Unstable cardiovascular status (angina, recent myocardial infarction, etc.)
 Thoracic, abdominal, or cerebral aneurysms
 Cataracts or recent eye surgery
 Recent thoracic or abdominal surgery
 Nausea, vomiting, or acute illness
 Recent or current viral infection
 Undiagnosed hypertension

Spirometry testing

Spirometer
The spirometry test is performed using a device called a spirometer, which comes in several different varieties. Most spirometers display the following graphs, called spirograms:
 a volume-time curve, showing volume (litres) along the Y-axis and time (seconds) along the X-axis
 a flow-volume loop, which graphically depicts the rate of airflow on the Y-axis and the total volume inspired or expired on the X-axis

Procedure
The basic forced volume vital capacity (FVC) test varies slightly depending on the equipment used, either closed circuit or open circuit, but should follow the ATS/ERS Standardisation of Spirometry.

Generally, the patient is asked to take the deepest breath they can, and then exhale into the sensor as hard as possible, for as long as possible, preferably at least 6 seconds. It is sometimes directly followed by a rapid inspiration, (inhalation) in particular when assessing possible upper airway obstruction.  Sometimes, the test will be preceded by a period of quiet breathing in and out from the sensor (tidal volume), or the rapid breath in (forced inspiratory part) will come before the forced expiration.

During the test, soft nose clips may be used to prevent air escaping through the nose. Filter mouthpieces may be used to prevent the spread of microorganisms.

Limitations of test
The maneuver is highly dependent on patient cooperation and effort, and is normally repeated at least three times to ensure reproducibility. Since results are dependent on patient cooperation, FVC can only be underestimated, never overestimated.

Due to the patient cooperation required, spirometry can only be used on children old enough to comprehend and follow the instructions given (6 years old or more), and only on patients who are able to understand and follow instructions — thus, this test is not suitable for patients who are unconscious, heavily sedated, or have limitations that would interfere with vigorous respiratory efforts. Other types of lung function tests are available for infants and unconscious persons.

Another major limitation is the fact that many intermittent or mild asthmatics have normal spirometry between acute exacerbation, limiting spirometry's usefulness as a diagnostic. It is more useful as a monitoring tool:  a sudden decrease in FEV1 or other spirometric measure in the same patient can signal worsening control, even if the raw value is still normal.  Patients are encouraged to record their personal best measures.

Related tests
Spirometry can also be part of a bronchial challenge test, used to determine bronchial hyperresponsiveness to either rigorous exercise, inhalation of cold/dry air, or with a pharmaceutical agent such as methacholine or histamine.

Sometimes, to assess the reversibility of a particular condition, a bronchodilator is administered before performing another round of tests for comparison. This is commonly referred to as a reversibility test, or a post bronchodilator test (Post BD), and is an important part in diagnosing asthma versus COPD.

Other complementary lung functions tests include plethysmography and nitrogen washout.

Parameters

The most common parameters measured in spirometry are Vital capacity (VC), Forced vital capacity (FVC), Forced expiratory volume (FEV) at timed intervals of 0.5, 1.0 (FEV1), 2.0, and 3.0 seconds, forced expiratory flow 25–75% (FEF 25–75) and maximal voluntary ventilation (MVV), also known as Maximum breathing capacity. Other tests may be performed in certain situations.

Results are usually given in both raw data (litres, litres per second) and percent predicted—the test result as a percent of the "predicted values" for the patients of similar characteristics (height, age, sex, and sometimes race and weight). The interpretation of the results can vary depending on the physician and the source of the predicted values. Generally speaking, results nearest to 100% predicted are the most normal, and results over 80% are often considered normal. Multiple publications of predicted values have been published and may be calculated based on age, sex, weight and ethnicity.  However, review by a doctor is necessary for accurate diagnosis of any individual situation.

A bronchodilator is also given in certain circumstances and a pre/post graph comparison is done to assess the effectiveness of the bronchodilator. See the example printout.

Functional residual capacity (FRC) cannot be measured via spirometry, but it can be measured with a plethysmograph or dilution tests (for example, helium dilution test).

Forced vital capacity (FVC)
Forced vital capacity (FVC) is the volume of air that can forcibly be blown out after full inspiration, measured in liters. FVC is the most basic maneuver in spirometry tests.

Forced expiratory volume in 1 second (FEV1)
FEV1 is the volume of air that can forcibly be blown out in first 1-second, after full inspiration. Average values for FEV1 in healthy people depend mainly on sex and age, according to the diagram.
Values of between 80% and 120% of the average value are considered normal. Predicted normal values for FEV1 can be calculated and depend on age, sex, height, mass and ethnicity as well as the research study that they are based on.

FEV1/FVC ratio
FEV1/FVC is the ratio of FEV1 to FVC. In healthy adults this should be approximately 70–80% (declining with age). In obstructive diseases (asthma, COPD, chronic bronchitis, emphysema) FEV1 is diminished because of increased airway resistance to expiratory flow; the FVC may be decreased as well, due to the premature closure of airway in expiration, just not in the same proportion as FEV1 (for instance, both FEV1 and FVC are reduced, but the former is more affected because of the increased airway resistance). This generates a reduced value (<70%, often ~45%). In restrictive diseases (such as pulmonary fibrosis) the FEV1 and FVC are both reduced proportionally and the value may be normal or even increased as a result of decreased lung compliance.

A derived value of FEV1 is FEV1% predicted (FEV1%), which is defined as FEV1 of the patient divided by the average FEV1 in the population for any person of the same age, height, gender, and race.

Forced expiratory flow (FEF)
Forced expiratory flow   (FEF) is the flow (or speed) of air coming out of the lung during the middle portion of a forced expiration.
It can be given at discrete times, generally defined by what fraction of the forced vital capacity (FVC) has been exhaled.
The usual discrete intervals are 25%, 50% and 75% (FEF25, FEF50 and FEF75), or 25% and 50% of FVC that has been exhaled.
It can also be given as a mean of the flow during an interval, also generally delimited by when specific fractions remain of FVC, usually 25–75% (FEF25–75%). Average ranges in the healthy population depend mainly on sex and age, with FEF25–75% shown in diagram at left. Values ranging from 50 to 60% and up to 130% of the average are considered normal. Predicted normal values for FEF can be calculated and depend on age, sex, height, mass and ethnicity as well as the research study that they are based on.

MMEF or MEF stands for maximal (mid-)expiratory flow and is the peak of expiratory flow as taken from the flow-volume curve and measured in liters per second. It should theoretically be identical to peak expiratory flow (PEF), which is, however, generally measured by a peak flow meter and given in liters per minute.

Recent research suggests that FEF25-75% or FEF25-50% may be a more sensitive parameter than FEV1 in the detection of obstructive small airway disease.  However, in the absence of concomitant changes in the standard markers, discrepancies in mid-range expiratory flow may not be specific enough to be useful, and current practice guidelines recommend continuing to use FEV1, VC, and FEV1/VC as indicators of obstructive disease.

More rarely, forced expiratory flow may be given at intervals defined by how much remains of total lung capacity. In such cases, it is usually designated as e.g. FEF70%TLC, FEF60%TLC and FEF50%TLC.

Forced inspiratory flow 25–75% or 25–50%
Forced inspiratory flow 25–75% or 25–50% (FIF 25–75% or 25–50%) is similar to FEF 25–75% or 25–50% except the measurement is taken during inspiration.

Peak expiratory flow (PEF)

Peak expiratory flow (PEF) is the maximal flow (or speed) achieved during the maximally forced expiration initiated at full inspiration, measured in liters per minute or in liters per second.

Tidal volume (TV)
Tidal volume is the amount of air inhaled or exhaled normally at rest.

Total lung capacity (TLC)
Total lung capacity (TLC) is the maximum volume of air present in the lungs.

Diffusing capacity (DLCO)
Diffusing capacity (or DLCO) is the carbon monoxide uptake from a single inspiration in a standard time (usually 10 seconds). During the test the person inhales a test gas mixture that consisting of regular air that includes an inert tracer gas and CO, less than one percent. Since hemoglobin has a greater affinity to CO than oxygen the breath-hold time can be only 10 seconds, which is a sufficient amount of time for this transfer of CO to occur. Since the inhaled amount of CO is known, the exhaled CO is subtracted to determine the amount transferred during the breath-hold time. The tracer gas is analyzed simultaneously with CO to determine the distribution of the test gas mixture. This test will pick up diffusion impairments, for instance in pulmonary fibrosis. This must be corrected for anemia (a low hemoglobin concentration will reduce DLCO) and pulmonary hemorrhage (excess RBC's in the interstitium or alveoli can absorb CO and artificially increase the DLCO capacity). Atmospheric pressure and/or altitude will also affect measured DLCO, and so a correction factor is needed to adjust for standard pressure.

Maximum voluntary ventilation (MVV)
Maximum voluntary ventilation (MVV) is a measure of the maximum amount of air that can be inhaled and exhaled within one minute. For the comfort of the patient this is done over a 15-second time period before being extrapolated to a value for one minute expressed as liters/minute. Average values for males and females are 140–180 and 80–120 liters per minute respectively.

Static lung compliance (Cst)
When estimating static lung compliance, volume measurements by the spirometer needs to be complemented by pressure transducers in order to simultaneously measure the transpulmonary pressure. When having drawn a curve with the relations between changes in volume to changes in transpulmonary pressure, Cst is the slope of the curve during any given volume, or, mathematically, ΔV/ΔP. Static lung compliance is perhaps the most sensitive parameter for the detection of abnormal pulmonary mechanics. It is considered normal if it is 60% to 140% of the average value in the population for any person of similar age, sex and body composition.

In those with acute respiratory failure on mechanical ventilation, "the static compliance of the total respiratory system is conventionally obtained by dividing the tidal volume by the difference between the 'plateau' pressure measured at the airway opening (PaO) during an occlusion at end-inspiration and positive end-expiratory pressure (PEEP) set by the ventilator".

Others
Forced Expiratory Time (FET)
Forced Expiratory Time (FET) measures the length of the expiration in seconds.

Slow vital capacity (SVC)
Slow vital capacity (SVC) is the maximum volume of air that can be exhaled slowly after slow maximum inhalation.

Maximal pressure (Pmax and Pi)

Pmax is the asymptotically maximal pressure that can be developed by the respiratory muscles at any lung volume and Pi is the maximum inspiratory pressure that can be developed at specific lung volumes. This measurement also requires pressure transducers in addition. It is considered normal if it is 60% to 140% of the average value in the population for any person of similar age, sex and body composition. A derived parameter is the coefficient of retraction (CR) which is Pmax/TLC .

Mean transit time (MTT)
Mean transit time is the area under the flow-volume curve divided by the forced vital capacity.

Maximal inspiratory pressure (MIP)
MIP, also known as negative inspiratory force (NIF), is the maximum pressure that can be generated against an occluded airway beginning at functional residual capacity (FRC). It is a marker of respiratory muscle function and strength. Represented by centimeters of water pressure (cmH2O) and measured with a manometer. Maximum inspiratory pressure is an important and noninvasive index of diaphragm strength and an independent tool for diagnosing many illnesses. Typical maximum inspiratory pressures in adult males can be estimated from the equation, MIP = 142 - (1.03 x Age) cmH2O, where age is in years.

Technologies used in spirometers
 Volumetric Spirometers
 Water bell
 Bellows wedge
 Flow measuring Spirometers
 Fleisch-pneumotach
 Lilly (screen) pneumotach
 Turbine/Stator Rotor (normally incorrectly referred to as a turbine. Actually a rotating vane which spins because of the air flow generated by the subject. The revolutions of the vane are counted as they break a light beam)
 Pitot tube
 Hot-wire anemometer
 Ultrasound

See also 
 Peak flow meter
 Nitrogen washout

References

Further reading

External links

 American Thoracic Society (ATS)
 European Respiratory Society (ERS)

Pulmonary function testing
Respiratory physiology
Respiratory therapy